United Nations Security Council Resolution 276, adopted on January 30, 1970, after reaffirming previous resolutions and statements, the Council condemned South Africa's continued occupation of Namibia as illegal and decided to establish an ad hoc sub-committee to study the ways and means by which the Council's resolutions could be implemented.  The Council requested all states and organizations give the sub-committee all the information and other assistance it may require and further requested the Secretary-General to give every assistance to the sub-committee.

The Council decided to resume consideration of the question of Namibia as soon as the recommendations of the sub-committee have been made available.

The resolution was adopted with 13 votes; France and the United Kingdom abstained.

See also
 History of Namibia
 List of United Nations Security Council Resolutions 201 to 300 (1965–1971)
 South West Africa

References 
Text of the Resolution at undocs.org

External links
 

 0276
 0276
 0276
January 1970 events